The 2021 season was Birmingham Phoenix's first season of the new franchise 100 ball cricket, The Hundred. Both the men's and women's teams performed well in the competition qualifying for the knockout stages. However both teams lost their knockout games, the women's team losing in the eliminator match, finishing 3rd overall, while the men's team lost in the final, finishing as runners-up.

Players

Men's side 
 Bold denotes players with international caps.

Women's side 
 Bold denotes players with international caps.

Regular season

Fixtures (Men)

July

August

Fixtures (Women)

July

August

Standings

Men

 advances to the Final
 advances to the Eliminator

Women

 advances to the Final
 advances to the Eliminator

Knockout stages

Men

Final

Women

Eliminator

References

Cricket clubs established in 2019
2019 establishments in England
The Hundred (cricket)